Neidhart is both a surname and a given name. Notable people with the name include:

Christian Neidhart, German football manager
Jim Neidhart, Canadian professional wrestler
Natalya Neidhart, Canadian professional wrestler (daughter of Jim)
Neidhart von Reuental, a 13th-century German minnesinger
Nico Neidhart, German footballer